Robert Walser may refer to:

 Robert Walser (writer) (1878–1956), Swiss modernist writer
 Robert Walser (musicologist), American musicologist, author and professor

See also
 Walser (surname)